Vāraṇādrīśa, more commonly referred to as Pillai Lokacharya (1205–1311 CE), was a prominent Sri Vaishnava leader and philosopher who authored several works important to Vishishtadvaita philosophy.

Early life
Lokacharya is described to be a pupil of Kalijit, and Krishnapada, his father. At the beginning of the 14th century CE, when Tiruvarangam, his hometown, was greatly affected by the invasion of Malik Kafur from the north, he left Tiruvarangam with Utsavara to protect Nampillai, the Utsavara of Aranganatha temple, from foreigners, and was enthroned in 1311 CE at Jyotishkudi near Yanimalai village, near Madurai, in his 106th year.

Philosophy 
In his text of the Srivachana Bhushana, the acharya expresses his belief in the unconscious purification of human acts even in their physical and mental planes. A robber escaping from custody may go round a temple or any spiritual environment. Any sinner may call his friend, perhaps as a brother sinner but who in this country is as usual named after God. Pillai writes that God in writing the account of this soul gives credit for his having been in a holy environment and for his addressing the Lord by His name—“En uraicconnay, en peraicconnay”.

Lokacharya believed that God's grace is spontaneous (nirhetu, 'without cause'), and should be sought not only through bhakti or active devotion, but met by prapatti, a passive acceptance of God's grace that is supposed to be freely given. Bhakti was instructed to be of the marjara (cat) type, as opposed to the clinging monkey type of the school of Desika. By this, he meant that man has merely to lay down his burdens and give himself up completely to God, like a kitten held in its mother's mouth. No exertion was regarded to be needed on the part of the devotee, and all he requires was supposed to be the spirit of complete and utter surrender. This reflects the views of the Alvars. Lokacharya is the author of several works called Ashtadasa Rahasyangal (Eighteen Secrets) which were added to by his disciples and influenced a large, if licentious, following. Due to his teachings, the Tenkalai school regards the Tamil Prabandham as canonical, and is indifferent to the Sanskrit tradition. This school adopted the unique doctrine of doshabhogya, ‘sin-enjoyment', which holds that God enjoys, and indeed encourages, sin, the pleasures of the flesh, and moral transgression, since these provide a vehicle for the operation of divine grace, forgiveness, and love.

Works 
The Ashtadasa Rahasyangal included eighteen texts, most of which were penned in Manipravalam (a mix of the Tamil and Sanskrit languages).

 Mumukshupadi
 Tatvatrayam
 Artha Panjakam
 Srivachana Bhushanam
 Archiraadhi
 Prameya Sekaram
 Prapana Parithranam
 Sara Sangraham
 Samsara Samrajyam
 Navarathnamaalai
 Navavidha Sambandham
 Yadhruchikapadi
 Parandhapadi
 Sriya Pathi Padi
 Tatvashekaram
 Thani Dvayam
 Thani Charamam
 Thani Pranavam

Pillai is best known for his three works composed in Sanskrit:

Tattva-traya 
The Tattva-traya is a significant volume of the Sri Vaishnava school of thought, in which the nature of the inanimate (acit), the souls, the nature of God, and their mutual relations are dealt with at length.

Tattva-Shekara 
The Tattva-Shekhara is a text with four chapters. The first chapter quotes scriptural evidences that bolster the perspective that Narayana is the highest God, and the Ultimate Reality; in the second chapter, the philosopher describes the nature of self by once again referencing scriptural testimony. The identical description of the nature of self is continued in the third chapter. In the fourth chapter, he deals with the ultimate goal of all souls, which he states to be self-surrender to God. He says that the ultimate summum bonum (puruṣartha) consists in the servitude (kaiṅkarya) to God, roused by love of him (prīti-kārita), due to the knowledge of one’s own nature, as well as the nature of God in all his divine beauty, majesty, power, and supreme excellence.

Srivachana Bhushana 
The main contents of Pillai Lokacharya’s Srivachana Bhushana follow in a separate section in connection with the account of the commentary on it, and additional commentary by Saumya Jamatar muni (junior) and Raghuttama. The Srivachana Bhushana includes 484 small sentences longer than the Sura-phrases, but is often shorter than ordinary philosophical sentences. Lokacharya followed this style in his other works as well, such as his Tattva-traya and Tattva-shekhara.

Death
Pillai Lokacharya is stated to have fallen ill due to a fall from a nearby hill (today known as Yanamalai) and died in the year 1311 CE. Upon his deathbed, he advised his disciples such as Koorakuloththama Dasa and Vilanjsolai Pillai that Srisailesa was working for the king at Madurai, and that they should bring him back into the Sri Vaishnava fold. His samadhi temple still exists, present 1 km from the Narasimha temple at Othakadai, near Madurai.

According to legend, as he was dying, he started touching the ants and other such insects near him, with the belief that all those animals that were touched by a Sri Vaishnava would reach Vaikuntha, the abode of Vishnu. This is taken as a demonstration of his compassion towards all living beings. Pillai Lokacharya lived to the age of 118 years before his demise.

Legacy 
One of Pillai Lokacharya's best known disciples was Manavala Mamunigal, who was a radical proponent of Sri Vaishnavism, and is revered prominently in the Tenkalai (southern art) denomination.

See also
Ramanuja
Manavala Mamunigal

References

External links
Pillai Lokacharya life history and works – from acharya.org
Srivaishnava.org
Vedics Foundation
Pillai Lokacharya

1205 births
1311 deaths
13th-century Indian philosophers
Vaishnavism
Sri Vaishnavism
Hindu philosophers and theologians
Indian centenarians
Medieval Hindu religious leaders
Men centenarians